Bongards is an unincorporated community in Benton Township, Carver County, Minnesota, United States.

U.S. Highway 212 and Carver County Road 51 are two of the main routes in the community.  Nearby places include Cologne and Norwood Young America.

References

Unincorporated communities in Carver County, Minnesota
Unincorporated communities in Minnesota